Hawaiian Independence Day is a national holiday celebrated annually on November 28 in the Hawaiian Kingdom, which commemorates the signing of Anglo-Franco Proclamation of 1843, the official diplomatic recognition of the independence and sovereignty of the kingdom by Great Britain and France. It is still celebrated today by proponents of the Hawaiian sovereignty movement.

Background 

In 1839, Captain Cyrille Pierre Théodore Laplace of the French frigate Artémise landed in Honolulu in what became known as the Laplace Affair and forced the Hawaiian government under King Kamehameha III to acknowledge the rights of Catholics in his realm with the Edict of Toleration. The Hawaiian government also had to pay $20,000 in compensation to the French.
Anticipating further foreign encroachment on Hawaiian territory following the Laplace Affair, King Kamehameha III dispatched a diplomatic delegation to the United States and Europe to secure the recognition of Hawaiian independence.

Timoteo Haʻalilio, William Richards and Sir George Simpson were commissioned as joint Ministers Plenipotentiary on April 8, 1842. Simpson left for Great Britain while Haʻalilio and Richards went to the United States on July 8, 1842. The Hawaiian delegation secured the assurance of United States President John Tyler on December 19, 1842 of Hawaiian independence and then met Simpson in Europe to secure formal recognition by the United Kingdom and France. Their first meeting with British Secretary of State for Foreign Affairs George Hamilton-Gordon, 4th Earl of Aberdeen on February 22, 1843 was unsuccessful. Traveling to Brussels and then Paris, the Hawaiian delegation gained the support of King Leopold I of Belgium who was sympathetic and promise to use his influence to help them gain recognition. On March 17, 1843, French foreign minister François Guizot, on behalf of King Louis Philippe I, assured them that the French government would recognize Hawaiian independence. After returning to London, on April 1, 1843, Lord Aberdeen, on behalf of Queen Victoria, assured the Hawaiian delegation, "Her Majesty's Government was willing and had determined to recognize the independence of the Sandwich Islands under their present sovereign."

While the diplomatic party was away, a British naval captain Lord George Paulet, without the authorization of his superiors, unilaterally occupied the kingdom of Hawaii in the name Queen Victoria despite the protests of the Hawaiian government. After a five-month occupation, Rear-Admiral Richard Darton Thomas, the Commander-in-Chief of the Pacific Station, restored sovereignty to Kamehameha III. This event on July 31, 1843 was later commemorated as Sovereignty Restoration Day (Lā Hoʻihoʻi Ea).

On November 28, 1843, at the Court of London, the British and French governments formally recognized the independence of the Kingdom of Hawaii in the Anglo-Franco Proclamation, a joint declaration by France and Britain, signed by Lord Aberdeen and the Comte de Saint-Aulaire, representatives of Queen Victoria and King Louis-Philippe, respectively. The United States declined to join in the proclamation stating that in order for such a recognition to be binding, it would require a formal treaty ratified by the United States Senate.

Historical observance  
The anniversary of the Anglo-Franco Proclamation on November 28 was subsequently made a public holiday during the Hawaiian monarchy. In 1898, the legislature of the Republic of Hawaii made November 28 Thanksgiving Day. After the annexation of Hawaii to the United States, the holiday lost official recognition.

Modern-day observance 
It is still celebrated today by proponents of the Hawaiian sovereignty movement. Attempts have been made to restore it as an official holiday in the state of Hawaii.

See also 
 Hawaiian Sovereignty Restoration Day

References

Bibliography 

Celebrations in Hawaii
November observances
1843 establishments in Hawaii
Hawaii
Fall events in the United States